The Academy for Academic Excellence (AAE) is a K-12 public charter school based in Apple Valley, California. It is part of the Lewis Center for Educational Research (LCER), named for a major supporter, then Congressman Jerry Lewis. The school was first chartered in 1997 by the Apple Valley Unified School District. LCER currently operates two TK-12 campuses -  the Mojave River Campus in Apple Valley, and the Norton Science and Language Academy in San Bernardino, California.

GAVRT Project
In its capacity under the Lewis Center for Educational Research, AAE is involved in a partnership with NASA, the Jet Propulsion Laboratory, and Apple Valley Unified School District in the Goldstone Apple Valley Radio Telescope project. Students at AAE have the opportunity to conduct radio astronomy observations using internet connection to control a 34-meter antenna at NASA's Deep Space Network Goldstone Complex.

JROTC Program
In 2007,  AAE became the only public charter school in the state of California with an AFJROTC program, instructed by Colonel George Armstrong, (former U.S Air Force Pilot) (Ret) and Master Sergeant Harold Padua (Ret). By 2021, one fourth of AAE high school students were enrolled in the AFJROTC program. 

In 2021, the AFJROTC program was one of only ten programs nationwide to be selected for conversion to the inaugural cohort of the United States Space Force JROTC.

Awards
AAE received a California Distinguished School Award in 2007. Most recently, the AAE was named a Certified Charter School by the California Charter Schools Association.  Only 39 charter schools in California have received this recognition.  In 2014, the AAE was voted as Best Elementary, Best Middle School and Best High School by readers of the Daily Press.

References

External links
 

Charter K-12 schools in California
Schools in San Bernardino County, California
Educational institutions established in 1997
1997 establishments in California